Sarah Vance is an American politician from Alaska. Vance is a Republican member of the Alaska House of Representatives, representing the 31st District since 2019.

Political career
Sarah Vance began her political career as Co-Chair and spokesperson  for Heartbeat of Homer, a local recall campaign against three members of the Homer City Council in Homer, Alaska. The group campaigned to recall 3 members of the Homer City Council over transparency complaints. The group accused the city council  members(Donna Aderhold, David Lewis, and Catriona Reynolds) of lying to the public about the intention behind an "inclusivity resolution", which the group alleges was an attempt to declare Homer a sanctuary city. All three council members retained their seats by wide margins.

Vance ran for the Homer City Council in 2017, finishing third.

Vance defeated incumbent Representative Paul Seaton in the 2018 general election.

Vance is running for re-election on November 3, 2020. Running against Vance as an undeclared candidate is Kenai Peninsula Borough Assembly President  Kelly Cooper.

References

Living people
Republican Party members of the Alaska House of Representatives
21st-century American women politicians
21st-century American politicians
1979 births